James Hett (born 13 April 1958) is a Canadian former swimmer. He competed in two events at the 1976 Summer Olympics.

References

External links
 

1958 births
Living people
Canadian male swimmers
Olympic swimmers of Canada
Swimmers at the 1976 Summer Olympics
Sportspeople from Kitchener, Ontario
20th-century Canadian people
21st-century Canadian people